The Carillon Neighborhood Historic District encompasses a residential area of western Richmond, Virginia, USA. Although this area has a residential history dating back to the 19th century (when it was mainly country estates), its present architecture is reflective of its development first as a streetcar suburb, and then as a post-World War II housing development area.

The district was listed on the National Register of Historic Places in 2016.

See also
National Register of Historic Places listings in Richmond, Virginia

References

Historic districts on the National Register of Historic Places in Virginia
Buildings and structures in Richmond, Virginia
National Register of Historic Places in Richmond, Virginia